Epsom is a New Zealand parliamentary electorate, returning one Member of Parliament to the New Zealand House of Representatives. As of the 2020 general election, its member of parliament is David Seymour, the leader of ACT New Zealand.

Epsom has been an important electorate in New Zealand politics as, since 2005, it allowed the ACT Party to gain seats in parliament without meeting the five percent party vote threshold as the party leaders David Seymour, John Banks and Rodney Hide each won the electorate.

Population centres
Epsom is based around central and eastern Auckland isthmus. It contains the suburbs of Parnell, Remuera, Mount Eden, Newmarket, half of Greenlane and the eponymous suburb of Epsom. Under boundary changes resulting from the 2006 census, Epsom was enlarged to include the central city suburb of Grafton, but most of the area was lost again following the 2013 census. It is New Zealand's smallest electorate, covering just .

Epsom was created ahead of the first Mixed Member Proportional (MMP) election in 1996, carved out of the Remuera and Eden seats. Remuera was a safe seat for the National Party, having never elected a member of parliament from the Labour Party, while Eden was a bellwether seat, changing hands with the change of government. Both of these seats were held by National MPs – Christine Fletcher in Eden and Doug (later Sir Douglas) Graham in Remuera.

The electorate's population is predominantly European New Zealanders with a significant Asian population. The median household income is $118,300 – the highest of all New Zealand electorates.

History
The Epsom seat was first contested in New Zealand's first MMP election in 1996. The National party candidate was Christine Fletcher; she came out of the election with the nation's biggest personal majority: a 19,000 vote margin over the second placed Labour candidate, Helen Duncan.

With Fletcher standing down at the 1999 election to focus on her role as the newly elected Mayor of Auckland, the electorate battle was a contest between new National candidate Richard Worth and ACT List MP Rodney Hide. Worth won the seat by approximately 1,900 votes. In 2002, he easily retained Epsom, with other parties contesting only the party vote.

The 2005 race for Epsom was won by Rodney Hide after a tough contest for the personal vote. As the leader of ACT, Hide was determined to contest Epsom in order to guarantee his party's representation in the next parliament, should ACT not break the five percent threshold – under New Zealand electoral law, a party can gain representation by either getting five percent of the vote or by winning one or more electoral seats.

As it became more likely ACT would not break five percent, the campaign in Epsom became more intense, with Hide lobbying voters to vote strategically to keep ACT in Parliament, a message that ultimately prevailed, with National MP Richard Worth, defeated by 3,102 votes on election night and returned to Parliament via the National Party list. Hide's win in Epsom also allowed ACT member Heather Roy to enter parliament.

Hide increased his majority in 2008, and winning Epsom allowed four other ACT MPs to enter parliament. But Hide stepped down as ACT leader in April 2011 after succumbing to a leadership challenge from Don Brash. The ACT party selected former Auckland Mayor John Banks as their candidate for the 2011 election, who won the contest.

In 2013, John Banks announced that he would leave Parliament at the 2014 election, and so would not contest the Epsom electorate. After being found guilty at trial for electoral fraud, he announced his resignation effective 13 June 2014, leaving the Epsom seat vacant. Due to the proximity of the next general election, Parliament voted by supermajority to avoid a by-election.

Members of Parliament
Key

List MPs
Members of Parliament elected from party lists in elections where that person also unsuccessfully contested the Epsom electorate. Unless otherwise stated, all MPs terms began and ended at general elections.

1Replaced Jill White as list MP
2Resigned June 2009, list place taken by Cam Calder

Election results

2020 election

2017 election

2014 election

2011 election

Electorate (as at 26 November 2011): 48,761

2008 election

2005 election

2002 election

1999 election

1996 election

Footnotes

References

External links
Electorate Profile  Parliamentary Library

New Zealand electorates
New Zealand electorates in the Auckland Region
1996 establishments in New Zealand